Catherine Feller (born 1939) is a British actress and educator. She is perhaps best known for her role as Oliver Reed's love interest in the Hammer Film Productions' The Curse of the Werewolf (1961). She appeared in Waltz of the Toreadors (1962) with Peter Sellers, and in the first colour episode "The Queen's Ransom" of The Saint TV show.

Career
In 1955, as a sixteen-year-old, Feller appeared in a production of The Lark at the Lyric, Hammersmith. The same year, she was featured in the Tatler modelling beachwear.

Feller has experience as an actress in several theatre performances, films and TV series in Italy and the United Kingdom, working for the BBC, the RAI and many other theatres and broadcasting companies. She has collaborated with several public and private schools as a lecturer on expressiveness and conversation courses addressed to teachers and students. She has performed her shows and laboratory activities sponsored by L’Astrolabio throughout Italian schools. Fluent in Italian, she also works as a translator for the magazine Vogue Gioiello, the Italian magazine for gems jewels, diamonds ornamental, and fashion trend.

Filmography

External links

References

British actresses
British translators
Living people
1939 births
British women writers